Młynary is a settlement in Gmina Wąsosz, Góra County, Lower Silesian Voivodeship, in south-western Poland.

From 1975 to 1998 the village was in Leszno Voivodeship.

References

Villages in Góra County